Esposende is a city and a municipality in Braga District in Portugal. The population in 2011 was 34,254, in an area of 95.41 km². The city itself (the parish Esposende, Marinhas e Gandra) had a population of 9,197 in 2001. It gained city status on 2 July 1993. The present Mayor is Fernando Couto Cepa, elected by the Social Democratic Party. The municipal holiday is August 19. It is located on the Portuguese Way of the Camino de Santiago.

Demographics

Economy
Fishing, agriculture and tourism are important for the economy of the municipality. Prozis, a multinational sports nutrition company, is headquartered in Esposende.

Parishes
Administratively, the municipality is divided into nine civil parishes (freguesias):

 Antas
 Apúlia e Fão 
 Belinho e Mar
 Esposende, Marinhas e Gandra
 Fonte Boa e Rio Tinto
 Forjães
 Gemeses
 Palmeira de Faro e Curvos
 Vila Chã

Photos

Notable people 
 António Rodrigues Sampaio (1806—1882) a politician and President of the Council of Ministers in 1881
 Paulo Gonçalves (1979–2020) a rally racing motorcycle rider.
 Teresa Portela (born 1987) a sprint canoer 
 Arsénio Nunes (born 1989) a footballer with over 300 club caps
 Rafael Lopes (born 1991) a footballer with over 400 club caps

References

External links

 Photos from Esposende

 
Towns in Portugal
Municipalities of Braga District